Albinism is a congenital condition characterized in humans by the partial or complete absence of pigment in the skin, hair and eyes. Albinism is associated with a number of vision defects, such as photophobia, nystagmus, and amblyopia. Lack of skin pigmentation makes for more susceptibility to sunburn and skin cancers. In rare cases such as Chédiak–Higashi syndrome, albinism may be associated with deficiencies in the transportation of melanin granules. This also affects essential granules present in immune cells leading to increased susceptibility to infection.

Albinism results from inheritance of recessive gene alleles and is known to affect all vertebrates, including humans. It is due to absence or defect of tyrosinase, a copper-containing enzyme involved in the production of melanin. Unlike humans, other animals have multiple pigments and for these, albinism is considered to be a hereditary condition characterised by the absence of melanin in particular, in the eyes, skin, hair, scales, feathers or cuticle. While an organism with complete absence of melanin is called an albino, an organism with only a diminished amount of melanin is described as leucistic or albinoid. The term is from the Latin albus, "white".

Signs and symptoms
There are two principal types of albinism: oculocutaneous, affecting the eyes, skin and hair, and ocular affecting the eyes only.

There are different types of oculocutaneous albinism depending on which gene has undergone mutation. With some there is no pigment at all. The other end of the spectrum of albinism is "a form of albinism called rufous oculocutaneous albinism, which usually affects dark-skinned people".

According to the National Organization for Albinism and Hypopigmentation, "With ocular albinism, the color of the iris of the eye may vary from blue to green or even brown, and sometimes darkens with age. However, when an optometrist or ophthalmologist examines the eye by shining a light from the side of the eye, the light shines back through the iris since very little pigment is present."

Because individuals with albinism have skin that entirely lacks the dark pigment melanin, which helps protect the skin from the sun's ultraviolet radiation, their skin can burn more easily from overexposure.

The human eye normally produces enough pigment to color the iris blue, green or brown and lend opacity to the eye. In photographs, those with albinism are more likely to demonstrate "red eye", due to the red of the retina being visible through the iris. Lack of pigment in the eyes also results in problems with vision, both related and unrelated to photosensitivity.

Those with albinism are generally as healthy as the rest of the population (but see related disorders below), with growth and development occurring as normal, and albinism by itself does not cause mortality, although the lack of pigment blocking ultraviolet radiation increases the risk of melanomas (skin cancers) and other problems.

Visual problems

Development of the optical system is highly dependent on the presence of melanin. For this reason, the reduction or absence of this pigment in people with albinism may lead to:
 Misrouting of the retinogeniculate projections, resulting in abnormal decussation (crossing) of optic nerve fibres
 Photophobia and decreased visual acuity due to light scattering within the eye (ocular straylight) Photophobia is specifically when light enters the eye, unrestrictedwith full force. It is painful and causes extreme sensitivity to light.
 Reduced visual acuity due to foveal hypoplasia and possibly light-induced retinal damage.

Eye conditions common in albinism include:
 Nystagmus, irregular rapid movement of the eyes back and forth, or in circular motion.
 Amblyopia, decrease in acuity of one or both eyes due to poor transmission to the brain, often due to other conditions such as strabismus.
 Optic nerve hypoplasia, underdevelopment of the optic nerve.

The improper development of the retinal pigment epithelium (RPE), which in normal eyes absorbs most of the reflected sunlight, further increases glare due to light scattering within the eye. The resulting sensitivity (photophobia) generally leads to discomfort in bright light, but this can be reduced by the use of sunglasses or brimmed hats.

Genetics
Oculocutaneous albinism is generally the result of the biological inheritance of genetically recessive alleles (genes) passed from both parents of an individual such as OCA1 and OCA2.  A mutation in the human TRP-1 gene may result in the deregulation of melanocyte tyrosinase enzymes, a change that is hypothesized to promote brown versus black melanin synthesis, resulting in a third oculocutaneous albinism (OCA) genotype, "OCA3". Some rare forms are inherited from only one parent. There are other genetic mutations which are proven to be associated with albinism. All alterations, however, lead to changes in melanin production in the body.  Some of these are associated with increased risk of skin cancer .

The chance of offspring with albinism resulting from the pairing of an organism with albinism and one without albinism is low. However, because organisms (including humans) can be carriers of genes for albinism without exhibiting any traits, albinistic offspring can be produced by two non-albinistic parents. Albinism usually occurs with equal frequency in both sexes. An exception to this is ocular albinism, which it is passed on to offspring through X-linked inheritance. Thus, ocular albinism occurs more frequently in males as they have a single X and Y chromosome, unlike females, whose genetics are characterized by two X chromosomes.

There are two different forms of albinism: a partial lack of the melanin is known as hypomelanism, or hypomelanosis, and the total absence of melanin is known as amelanism or amelanosis.

Enzyme
The enzyme defect responsible for OCA1-type albinism is tyrosine 3-monooxygenase (tyrosinase), which synthesizes melanin from the amino acid tyrosine.

Evolutionary theories
It is suggested that the early genus Homo (humans in the broader sense) started to evolve in East Africa around 3 million years ago. The dramatic phenotypic change from the ape-like Australopithecus to early Homo is hypothesized to have involved the extreme loss of body hair – except for areas most exposed to UV radiation, such as the head – to allow for more efficient thermoregulation in the early hunter-gatherers. The skin that would have been exposed upon general body hair loss in these early proto-humans would have most likely been non-pigmented, reflecting the pale skin underlying the hair of our chimpanzee relatives. A positive advantage would have been conferred to early hominids inhabiting the African continent that were capable of producing darker skin – those who first expressed the eumelanin-producing MC1R allele – which protected them from harmful epithelium-damaging ultraviolet rays. Over time, the advantage conferred to those with darker skin may have led to the prevalence of darker skin on the continent. The positive advantage, however, would have had to be strong enough so as to produce a significantly higher reproductive fitness in those who produced more melanin. The cause of a selective pressure strong enough to cause this shift is an area of much debate. Some hypotheses include the existence of significantly lower reproductive fitness in people with less melanin due to lethal skin cancer, lethal kidney disease due to excess vitamin D formation in the skin of people with less melanin, or simply natural selection due to mate preference and sexual selection.

When comparing the prevalence of albinism in Africa to its prevalence in other parts of the world, such as Europe and the United States, the potential evolutionary effects of skin cancer as a selective force due to its effect on these populations may not be insignificant. It would follow, then, that there would be stronger selective forces acting on albino individuals in Africa than on albinos in Europe and the US. In two separate studies in Nigeria, very few people with albinism appear to survive to old age. One study found that 89% of people diagnosed with albinism are between 0 and 30 years of age, while the other found that 77% of albinos were under the age of 20.

Diagnosis

Genetic testing can confirm albinism and what variety it is, but offers no medical benefits, except in the case of non-OCA disorders. Such disorders cause other medical problems in conjunction with albinism, and may be treatable. Genetic tests are currently available for parents who want to find out if they are carriers of ty-neg albinism. Diagnosis of albinism involves carefully examining a person's eyes, skin and hairs. Genealogical analysis can also help.

Management
Since there is no cure for albinism, it is managed through lifestyle adjustments. People with albinism need to take care not to get sunburnt and should have regular healthy skin checks by a dermatologist.

For the most part, treatment of the eye conditions consists of visual rehabilitation. Surgery is possible on the extra-ocular muscles to decrease strabismus. Nystagmus-damping surgery can also be performed, to reduce the "shaking" of the eyes back and forth. The effectiveness of all these procedures varies greatly and depends on individual circumstances.

Glasses, low vision aids, large-print materials, and bright angled reading lights can help individuals with albinism. Some people with albinism do well using bifocals (with a strong reading lens), prescription reading glasses, hand-held devices such as magnifiers or monoculars or wearable devices like eSight
and Brainport.

The condition may lead to abnormal development of the optic nerve and sunlight may damage the retina of the eye as the iris cannot filter out excess light due to a lack of pigmentation. Photophobia may be ameliorated by the use of sunglasses which filter out ultraviolet light. Some use bioptics, glasses which have small telescopes mounted on, in, or behind their regular lenses, so that they can look through either the regular lens or the telescope. Newer designs of bioptics use smaller light-weight lenses. Some US states allow the use of bioptic telescopes for driving motor vehicles. (See also NOAH bulletin "Low Vision Aids".)

There are a number of national support groups across the globe which come under the umbrella of the World Albinism Alliance.

Epidemiology
Albinism affects people of all ethnic backgrounds; its frequency worldwide is estimated to be approximately one in 17,000. Prevalence of the different forms of albinism varies considerably by population, and is highest overall in people of sub-Saharan African descent. Today, the prevalence of albinism in sub-Saharan Africa is around 1 in 5,000, while in Europe and the US it is around 1 in 20,000 of the European derived population. Rates as high as 1 in 1,000 have been reported for some populations in Zimbabwe and other parts of Southern Africa.

Certain ethnic groups and populations in isolated areas exhibit heightened susceptibility to albinism, presumably due to genetic factors. These include notably the Native American Kuna, Zuni and Hopi nations (respectively of Panama, New Mexico and Arizona); Japan, in which one particular form of albinism is unusually common (OCA 4); and Ukerewe Island, the population of which shows a very high incidence of albinism.

Society and culture
In physical terms, humans with albinism commonly have visual problems and need sun protection.

Persecution of people with albinism

Humans with albinism often face social and cultural challenges (even threats), as the condition is often a source of ridicule, discrimination, or even fear and violence. It is especially socially stigmatised in many African societies. A study conducted in Nigeria on albino children stated that "they experienced alienation, avoided social interactions and were less emotionally stable. Furthermore, affected individuals were less likely to complete schooling, find employment, and find partners". Many cultures around the world have developed beliefs regarding people with albinism.

In African countries such as Tanzania and Burundi, there has been an unprecedented rise in witchcraft-related killings of people with albinism in recent years, because their body parts are used in potions sold by witch doctors. Numerous authenticated incidents have occurred in Africa during the 21st century. For example, in Tanzania, in September 2009, three men were convicted of killing a 14-year-old albino boy and severing his legs in order to sell them for witchcraft purposes.  Again in Tanzania and Burundi in 2010, the murder and dismemberment of a kidnapped albino child was reported from the courts, as part of a continuing problem.  The US-based National Geographic Society estimated that in Tanzania a complete set of albino body parts is worth US$75,000.

Another harmful and false belief is that sex with an albinistic woman will cure a man of HIV. This has led, for example in Zimbabwe, to rapes (and subsequent HIV infection).

Albinism in popular culture

Famous people with albinism include historical figures such as Oxford don William Archibald Spooner; actor-comedian Victor Varnado; musicians such as Johnny and Edgar Winter, Salif Keita, Winston "Yellowman" Foster, Brother Ali, Sivuca, Hermeto Pascoal, Willie "Piano Red" Perryman, Kalash Criminel; actor-rapper Krondon, and fashion models Connie Chiu, Ryan "La Burnt" Byrne and Shaun Ross.  Emperor Seinei of Japan is thought to have been an albino because he was said to have been born with white hair.

International Albinism Awareness Day

International Albinism Awareness Day was established after a motion was accepted on 18 December 2014 by the United Nations General Assembly, proclaiming that 13 June would be known as International Albinism Awareness Day as of 2015.  This was followed by a mandate created by the United Nations Human Rights Council that appointed Ms. Ikponwosa Ero, who is from Nigeria, as the first Independent Expert on the enjoyment of human rights by persons with albinism.

See also

References

External links

 GeneReview/NCBI/NIH/UW entry on Oculocutaneous Albinism Type 2
 GeneReview/NCBI/NIH/UW entry on Oculocutaneous Albinism Type 4
 

 
Autosomal recessive disorders
Dermatologic terminology
Disturbances of human pigmentation
Skin pigmentation